Max Oliveras Gutiérrez [Mako] (born September 10, 1946 in Santurce, Puerto Rico) is a former Minor League Baseball player who later managed in the minors for several teams.  He joined the Alpha chapter of Phi Sigma Alpha fraternity in 1964.

Oliveras played seven seasons in the minor leagues.  He was also a coach in the Major Leagues for the California Angels and the Chicago Cubs.

In May , Oliveras took over as skipper of the independent Miami Marlins after Fred Hatfield was fired. He had been "widely praised for his work in the Puerto Rican Winter League", according to Baseball America's 1987 Statistics Report, and the Marlins won the most games they had in eight years.

In , he managed the Kinston Indians.

In between, Oliveras played for the Petroleros de Poza Rica of the Mexican League and piloted the Cangrejeros de Santurce club to Caribbean Series championships in the 1993 and 2000 tournaments.

He coached the Indios de Mayagüez to win the 2022-2023Puerto Rican Winter League.  Later coaching the Indios in the 2023 Caribbean Series he went on to become the coach with the most wins (28) in the history of the Caribbean Series.

References

External links

1946 births
Living people
Binghamton Mets managers
California Angels coaches
Caribbean Series managers
Chicago Cubs coaches
Greenville Red Sox players
Major League Baseball bench coaches
Major League Baseball first base coaches
Minor league baseball coaches
Pawtucket Red Sox players
Petroleros de Poza Rica players
Puerto Rican expatriate baseball players in Mexico
Salem Pirates players
Shreveport Captains players
Thetford Mines Pirates players
Winston-Salem Red Sox players
Winter Haven Red Sox players